Municipal Okrug #7 is a municipal okrug of Vasileostrovsky District of the federal city of St. Petersburg, Russia. Population:  

It borders Sredny Avenue, 25 Line, Bolshoy Avenue, Detskaya Street, and Kosaya Line in the north and in the west, the Neva River in the south and in east.

The eastern side of the okrug is old. The majority of the tourist sights, such as the Old Saint Petersburg Stock Exchange and Rostral Columns, Kunstkamera, Saint Petersburg State University, Imperial Academy of Arts, and the Menshikov Palace are located there.

The central part is mostly financial and is home to the Saint Petersburg Stock Exchange. The western side is mostly industrial and houses the port of Saint Petersburg.

In 2020 an okrug within the same district that the Municipal Okrug #7 is in, was one of the locations (along with Ostankino Tower, RKA Mission Control Center, Twitter headquarters in San Francisco, and at least one Aeroflot flight) that were the subject of a bioterrorism threat posted by group of hackers including those with names of "Thomas Little Evil Utoyo", "Calton", "David Law", "Thanthom", "Hendy", "Gideon W", "Audentis", "Mister Eriee O", "Khengwin", "T-Zehang", "曾家顺", "Mr Castaigne", "kkkwan", "ronxi", "KC LING", "Le3p0ryuen", "Jayrulo", "S Teoh", "Ian Chew", "Mr Yiliang", "W. somboonsuk", "S Patcharaphon", "Victor pang", "jiangxin", "文_祥!", "Freddyisf0xy", "Masami", "Greg Galloway", "EncoreOngKai", "Alteredd State", "Dig Dejected", Elmo Chong" and "Krully" onto various websites and Twitter feeds.

References

7
Financial districts in Russia
Central business districts in Russia